The Dnipropetrovsk River Port is an enterprise belonging to the river transport industry. The river port is located on the Dnieper  in the city of Dnipro and specializes in processing a wide range of goods - grain, scrap metal, rolled metal, sand, gravel, feldspar, lumber, equipment, packaging in bulk and on pallets. The port's cargo processing capacity is 10 million tons per year. The number of employees is 520 people. The port area includes two cargo areas and 13 berths with a total length of 2250 meters.

References

Transport in Dnipro
River ports of Ukraine
Companies based in Dnipro
Water transport in Ukraine